Daniel Peter Kirrane is a British actor.

Kirrane is from Huddersfield in West Yorkshire.

He is an avid Huddersfield Town fan. He graduated with a BSc in Physics with Astrophysics from Leeds University.

Filmography

Film

Television

References

External links

Living people
English male film actors
English male television actors
Male actors from Huddersfield
Alumni of the University of Leeds
Year of birth missing (living people)